Elias van den Broeck (1649, in Antwerp – buried 6 February 1708, in Amsterdam) was a Dutch Golden Age flower painter.

Biography
According to the RKD, in 1665 he became a pupil of Cornelis Kick in Amsterdam, and in 1669 he became a pupil of Jan Davidsz. de Heem in Utrecht. He is registered in a document stating his intention to go to Italy in 1672 (which may not have taken place). In 1673 he accompanied De Heem to Antwerp, where he became a master in the Guild of St. Luke there. In 1685 he returned to Amsterdam, where he lived 'outside the Utrecht gate on the Amstel beyond the Bergenvaarderskamer'. His pupil Philip van Kouwenbergh also became a good flower painter.

According to Houbraken, he was born in Antwerp and had been the first and best pupil of Ernst Stuven, whose works showed the influence of De Heem, and he painted all sorts of flowers, herbs, snakes, and salamanders. He lived outside the Utrecht gate on the Molenpad in Amsterdam where he kept a garden for his studio needs. Houbraken claimed that he died in 1711.

References

External links
 Christie's (Circle of Elias van den Broeck)
 Elias van den Broeck (Biography and selected works)

1649 births
1708 deaths
Dutch Golden Age painters
Dutch male painters
Flemish Baroque painters
Painters from Antwerp
Painters from Amsterdam
Flower artists